Atari Karts is a 1995 kart racing video game developed by Miracle Designs and published by Atari Corporation for the Atari Jaguar. In the game, the player takes control of one of eleven characters though only seven are available at first, each with differing capabilities. One or two players race against computer-controlled characters in four cups consisting of multiple tracks over four difficulty levels. During races, the players can obtain power-ups placed at predetermined points in the tracks and use them to gain an advantage. It plays similarly to Super Mario Kart and features Bentley Bear, main protagonist of the arcade game Crystal Castles (1983).

Atari Karts started production when Belgian programmers Filip Hautekeete and Peter Vermeulen received a development kit for the Jaguar from Atari, creating a demo featuring an emulated interpretation of the Mode 7 graphics mode seen in the Super Nintendo Entertainment System. Impressed with the demo, Atari decided to make a game with a "cutesy" atmosphere by combining F-Zero and Super Mario Kart, suggesting the usage of Bentley Bear and other Atari characters that did not make it into the final release. 

Atari Karts garnered mixed reception from critics, all of which accused it for being an obvious knock-off of Mario Kart. Miracle Designs began development on a sequel after release but never moved forward beyond the planning phase, however, Merlin Racing (2000) for Nuon is considered a spiritual successor to the game. In 2022, the game was included as part of the Atari 50: The Anniversary Celebration compilation.

Gameplay 

Atari Karts is a kart racing game similar to Super Mario Kart featuring single-player and multiplayer modes, where the main goal is to finish a race ahead of other racers controlled by the computer and other players. Before each race, a traffic light will appear to start countdown and the race begins when the light turns green. The players take control of one of seven characters available at the start of the game, each with differing capabilities, and drive karts around tracks from a third-person perspective behind the player's kart. When selecting a character, another player can join at any given time. Unlike Super Mario Kart, there are no time trial or battle modes present. Among the roster of racers, Bentley Bear from Crystal Castles (1983) is a playable character. The players can access an options menu where various settings can be changed such as controls and the type of terrain display when racing. The game features support for the ProController.

The players race against computer-controlled characters in three cups consisting of multiple tracks over four difficulty levels. The player can access the "Miracle Race" challenge by winning all of the three cups at the selected difficulty level of challenge, but only the easiest difficulty is initially available. In the Miracle Race, one or two players race against one of four boss characters and when defeated, they become playable characters. There are eleven selectable characters in total. As with Super Mario Kart, each cup consists of five-lap races and each one takes place on a distinct track, with more being unlocked on higher difficulties but in order to continue through a cup, a fourth or higher position must be achieved in each race. If a player finishes in fifth to eighth position, they are "ranked out" and the race must be replayed at the cost of one of a limited number of lives until a placing of fourth or above is earned.

During gameplay, power-ups placed at predetermined points in the tracks as tiles can be obtained and these give special abilities to a player's kart if the vehicle passes over them and can be used to gain an advantage. These power-ups can either benefit or harm those who have picked them up, ranging from a rabbit icon that give players a speed boost for a few seconds to a red icon that reverse the vehicle's controls for brief period of time as well. On two-player races, a green icon that reverse the opponent's controls is the only offensive power-up available on the game. If the player has no lives when they rank out, the game is over, though players can pick up a heart icon that is placed on a fixed spot on the track to gain an extra live.

Development and release 
Atari Karts was developed by Miracle Designs (previously Cyberdreams), a team of Belgian programmers. It was co-produced by Bill Rehbock (then-vice-president in third-party development at Atari Corporation) and Loïc Duval, with Filip Hautekeete and Peter Vermeulen acting as co-programmers. The soundtrack was composed in Protracker by Fabrice "Arpergiator" Gillet of the Amiga demoscene group Chryseis. Neither Gillet nor the people responsible for the artwork are listed in the game's credits, with the instruction manual just referring to them as the "Miracle Designs Team", though Duval and Jen Smith provided additional graphics and sound. Smith was also responsible for the cover illustration. Several staff members within Atari also collaborated in the game's development process. Rehbock recounted the project's creation and history in 2018.

According to Rehbock, Hautekeete and Vermeulen received an Alpine development kit for the Atari Jaguar from Atari themselves and started working on with it, creating a demo showcasing an emulated interpretation of the Mode 7 graphics mode found in the Super Nintendo Entertainment System to test the system's hardware capabilities and sent it to him and Atari producer J. Patton, becoming the starting point of the game's development. Impressed with the demo, Atari decided to make a game with a "cutesy" atmosphere by combining F-Zero and Super Mario Kart. Rehbock also suggested the usage of Bentley Bear, main protagonist of Crystal Castles (1983), along with other Atari characters that did not make it into the final release. Atari Karts makes extensive use of the Mode 7 technique developed by Miracle Designs for the Jaguar, featuring elevated and lowered terrains when racing on the tracks. The game also features homages to the history and games of Atari; The Borregas cup is a reference to the company's old address (1196 Borregas Avenue, Sunnyvale, California); The Tempest cup is named after Dave Theurer's arcade game Tempest (1981). Internal documentation from Atari showed that development of the game was completed by December 11, 1995.

The game was formally announced in early 1995 under the working title Kart and was also previewed under the names Super Kart and Super Karts, the latter of which led to confusion in a supplementary July 1995 issue by Edge magazine that Virgin Interactive's similarly named SuperKarts was being converted to the Jaguar. Additional internal documentation from and magazines listed the game under the name Atari Kart,  being advertised with a September 1995 launch window. The game was also featured in a promotional recording sent by Atari to video game retail stores on October 9, and showcased during an event hosted by Atari dubbed "Fun 'n' Games Day" under its final title, Atari Karts. The game was first published in North America on December 15 and later in Europe on December 22. 

After its release on the market, Miracle Designs began working on a sequel to the game but never moved forward beyond the planning phase. Merlin Racing, a 2000 racing game created by Miracle Designs and released for Nuon, is considered a spiritual successor to the game. Miracle Designs would later work on titles such as Hooters Road Trip, an adaptation based on the 2003 action comedy film Taxi 3, and XS Airboat Racing. Hautekeete and Vermeulen would go on to co-found Neopica, the sister studio of Sproing Interactive. In 2022, Atari Karts was included as part of the Atari 50: The Anniversary Celebration compilation for Nintendo Switch, PlayStation 4, Steam, and Xbox One, marking its first re-release.

Reception 

Atari Karts garnered mixed reception from critics, all of which accused it for being an obvious knock-off of Super Mario Kart. GameFans Dan Granett found the game visually impressive for Atari Jaguar standards, citing the use of details, colors, and parallax-scrolling backgrounds. Nevertheless, Granett criticized its lack of depth and easy completion, as well as the soundtrack. Mega Funs Ulf Schneider commended the karts for being easy to control and the colorful bitmap graphics but expressed mixed thoughts about the audio. Schneider ultimately felt that the game did not measure up to Mario Kart. He also noted the difficulty of drifting in curves using the keypad while driving. German publication ST-Computer concurred with Schneider on most points but recommended the game to Jaguar owners regardless, highlighting its split-screen multiplayer. In contrast, Computer and Video Games Paul Davies was very critical of the game, stating "How Atari have a hope when pitching this kind of rot against Sega Rally, and Wipeout I do not even try to understand." 

Electronic Gaming Monthlys two sports reviewers particularly faulted its dull track design. One of them elaborated that "Although the scenery changes, each race is an exercise in repetition: pick up icons, don't hit anything." They did, however, compliment the smoothness of the controls. Game Zero Magazines R.I.P. gave positive remarks to the game's audiovisual presentation but panned its handling controls. Marc Abramson of the French ST Magazine lauded the game for its pastel-toned visuals, music, sound effects, controls, and two-player mode. However, Abramson lamented the lack of support with the JagLink and Team Tap peripherals for more players, and criticized the positioning of power-ups on the tracks. Última Generacións Javier S. Fernández compared Atari Karts favorably with both Super Mario Kart and Street Racer by Ubi Soft, noting its character designs and colorful track settings. 

Video Games Jan Schweinitz agreed with R.I.P. regarding the handling. Regardless, Schweinitz wrote that "Even if the vehicle feel of Atari Karts isn't nearly as good as that of the Mario Karts, so much good stuff has been stolen from Nintendo's classic that even Atari racing is really fun." Fun Generations Stephan Girlich and Andreas Binzenhöfer praised the graphical presentation and gameplay but felt mixed about the audio. GamePros Air Hendrix commented that the game was well-made but too simplistic and cutesy to appeal to anyone but young children, concluding, "These races present just the right level of cuteness and challenge for those younger Jaguar gamers. The question, of course, is how many seven-year-olds are out there looking for Jag games?". Next Generation agreed that it was chiefly geared to a younger audience and lacked sophistication, and further criticized that the various tracks are visually different but handle and feel the same. However, they said the game "does have a certain charm that makes it hard to avoid." MAN!ACs Robert Bannert commended the title for its audiovisual presentation, characters, and playability, but felt that the controls were inferior to Mario Kart. 

In a retrospective outlook, The Atari Times Gregory D. George criticized the lack of interesting power-ups and limited computer AI that resulted in perfect drivers as the player's competition. Author Andy Slaven regarded Atari Karts as one of the best racing games on the Jaguar. Nils Nils and Christian Roth of German website neXGam gave the positive remarks to the game's mode 7-style visuals and two-player mode, but its controls and lack of battle mode were seen as negative points.

References

External links 

 
 Atari Karts at AtariAge
 Atari Karts at GameFAQs
 Atari Karts at MobyGames

1995 video games
Atari games
Atari Jaguar games
Kart racing video games
Miracle Designs games
Multiplayer and single-player video games
Racing video games
Split-screen multiplayer games
Video games developed in Belgium